Mid Point is a skiway located in the East Antarctic Ice Sheet at midway between Zucchelli Station and the inland Concordia Station. The place is equipped with shelters, meteorological equipment, fuel bladders and tractors to clean the airstrip. An American researchers team lived at the camp for a time, in 2000, to carry out a project of ice drilling.

See also
 Zucchelli Station
 List of airports in Antarctica

References

 

Outposts of Antarctica
East Antarctica